Anna-Lena Strindlund (born 21 June 1971 in Högalid, Stockholm) is a Swedish actress. She has studied at Södra Latin.

Filmography

FIlm
Smådeckarna (2002)
Mongolpiparen (2004)
Wallander (2006)
Varannan vecka (2006)

Television
Skilda världar (1998)

References

External links

Actresses from Stockholm
Swedish actresses
Living people
1971 births